The imperial election of 8 March 1198 was an imperial election held to select the emperor of the Holy Roman Empire. It took place in Mühlhausen. It was the first election during the Great German Throne Dispute.

As a result of the election, Philip of Swabia was named Holy Roman Emperor.

1197
1198 in the Holy Roman Empire
12th-century elections
Non-partisan elections